Kevin James Dickenson (born 24 November 1962) is an English former professional footballer who played as a left back, making over 250 career appearances.

Career
Born in Hackney, Dickenson played for Tottenham Hotspur, Charlton Athletic and Leyton Orient.

References

1962 births
Living people
Footballers from the London Borough of Hackney
Association football defenders
English footballers
Tottenham Hotspur F.C. players
Charlton Athletic F.C. players
Leyton Orient F.C. players
English Football League players